Typhoon Iris was a catastrophic tropical cyclone that killed as many as 2,334 people in China. Originating from a tropical disturbance over the Philippine Sea on August 19, Iris tracked west-northwestward towards Luzon. Quickly developing into a typhoon by August 21, a northwestward turn kept the center of Iris offshore Luzon. Subsequently, Iris weakened to a tropical storm before making landfall near Kao-Chi, China. Once onshore, the storm rapidly transitioned into an extratropical cyclone and dissipated on August 23.

In the Philippines, rough seas associated with the typhoon caused multiple shipwrecks that killed at least 100 people. Across southeastern China, at least 720 people are known to have been killed by the storm; however, estimates range as high as 2,334.

Meteorological history

In mid-August, a tropical disturbance developed within the Intertropical Convergence Zone over the Philippine Sea. By August 19, the Japan Meteorological Agency (JMA) began monitoring this system as a tropical depression. Additionally, the Joint Typhoon Warning Center (JTWC) classified the system as a tropical storm. Initially, a strong ridge over Southeast Asia caused the storm to track slowly west-northwestward; however, the ridge gradually weakened over the following days. Upon becoming a typhoon, the JTWC named the system Iris. Later that day, Iris turned northwestward as the ridge weakened and brushed the northeastern tip of Luzon.

Later that day, United States Air Force reconnaissance plane flew into the storm and recorded a barometric pressure of 966 mbar (hPa), the lowest in relation to the storm. Late on August 22, Iris made landfall near Kao-Chi, China as a strong tropical storm. The storm then rapidly transitioned into an extratropical cyclone over China before dissipating late on August 23.

Impact
On August 21, Typhoon Iris brushed the northern coast of Luzon; however, there were no known reports of casualties or damage on land. Offshore, large swells produced by the storm were blamed on at least two shipwrecks. Following the incidents, the United States Seventh Fleet were sent to search for survivors. Near Palawan Island, at least 100 people drowned after a ferry sank; only 11 passengers were rescued. Five more people went missing near Quezon Province after their motorboat capsized.

Heavy rains from the typhoon spread across Taiwan on August 22, triggering significant flash flooding. Along the Haifenglun River, a railroad bridge was washed away. Across the Pescadore Islands, approximately 1,000 people were left homeless.

Across Fujian Province, torrential rains from the typhoon led to catastrophic flooding that killed at least 720 people, injured 618 and left 996 others missing; however, according to the National Oceanic and Atmospheric Administration, the death toll may be as high as 2,334.

See also

1959 Pacific typhoon season

Note

References

External links
Japan Meteorological Agency
Joint Typhoon Warning Center 
Digital Typhoon : Typhoon 195908 (IRIS) – National Institute of Informatics

1959 Pacific typhoon season
Typhoons in China
Typhoons in Taiwan
Typhoons in the Philippines